The OM608 is a turbocharged inline-four diesel engine produced by Renault, for use in Mercedes-Benz vehicles.

Design 
Due to Daimler AG's collaboration with the Renault–Nissan–Mitsubishi Alliance, the OM608 is heavily based on the Renault K9K engine. It features common rail direct injection with 2 valves per cylinder, and a cast iron engine block and crankcase with an aluminium alloy cylinder head. Differences include the engine control unit (ECU), a stop start engine system, a dual-mass flywheel, and the ancillaries.

Models

OM608 DE15 SCR 
 2018–present W177 A180d

References 

OM608
Diesel engines by model
Straight-four engines